Sarris is a surname. Notable people with the surname include:

 Andrew Sarris (1928–2012), American film critic
 Evangelos Sarris (1881–1917), officer of the Cretan gendarmerie
 Georgios Sarris (born 1989), Greek footballer
 Greg Sarris (born 1952), college professor, author, screenwriter, and current Chairman of the Federated Indians of Graton Rancheria
 Jerome Sarris, academic
 Michael Sarris (born 1946), former Cypriot Finance Minister
 Neoklis Sarris (1920–2011), academic
 Panagiotis Sarris (born 1975), retired Greek sprinter

See also
 Sarris Candies
 Sarris, the main villain of the film Galaxy Quest
 Wa'arat al-Sarris, village